William Holmes (29 October 1885 – 6 December 1951) was an English cricketer. Holmes was a right-handed batsman who bowled right-arm medium pace. He was born at Eastwood, Nottinghamshire.

Holmes made two first-class appearances for Nottinghamshire at Trent Bridge in the 1919 County Championship against Yorkshire and Lancashire. He scored a total of 33 runs in his two matches, at an average of 16.50 and a high score of 19. With the ball he took 4 wickets at a bowling average of 26.25, with best figures of 2/50.

He died at Doncaster, Yorkshire on 6 December 1951.

References

External links
William Holmes at ESPNcricinfo
William Holmes at CricketArchive

1885 births
1951 deaths
People from Eastwood, Nottinghamshire
Cricketers from Nottinghamshire
English cricketers
Nottinghamshire cricketers